The Class 398 Citylink is a fleet of 36 tram-train multiple units being built for Transport for Wales Rail by Swiss rolling stock manufacturer Stadler Rail. 

The units will be equipped with traction battery packages, allowing them to operate over non-electrified sections of track in addition to those with  overhead supplies.

History
The Wales & Borders rail franchise operator at the time, KeolisAmey Wales, commenced on 14 October 2018. During the franchise period, the operator was to oversee a full fleet replacement, with a batch of 36 brand new tram-trains set to join the fleet in 2023.

Operators

Transport for Wales
When built, Transport for Wales Rail Class 398 units will operate services on the Rhondda, Merthyr and City lines, and the Cardiff Bay Branch.

Fleet details

See also
 British Rail Class 399

References

398
Tram vehicles of the United Kingdom
Light rail in the United Kingdom
25 kV AC multiple units
Train-related introductions in 2023